Legacy is an American soccer team based in Williamsburg, Virginia, United States. The team plays in the Mid-Atlantic Conference of the National Premier Soccer League (NPSL), the fourth tier of the American soccer pyramid.

The team was founded in 1976 as Williamsburg Soccer Club. It played in the USL Premier Development League (PDL), considered roughly equal to the NPSL, until 2009, after which the franchise folded and the team left the league. In June 2013, it was announced that the club would re-join the fourth tier for the 2014 season in the NPSL.

The team plays its home games in James City County Stadium-Wanner Stadium. The team's colors are white, red and black.

History
The Williamsburg Soccer Club was founded as an amateur sports association serving the local community in 1976. In 2001, the club joined the United Soccer Leagues (USL), creating a team franchised in the Premier Development League (PDL). The team was known as Williamsburg Legacy until January 2007, when Williamsburg Soccer Club merged with the nearby Colonial Football Club to form the Virginia Legacy Soccer Club. The PDL team then changed its name to Virginia Legacy to reflect the merger.

The Legacy had a successful series of early years in the PDL, earning first or second-place finishes in their division. Following the 2009 season in which the club finished eighth, the team folded but continued to remain active as a youth and community soccer organization.

On June 4, 2013, it was announced that the Legacy would re-join the fourth tier of American soccer, this time in the alternative National Premier Soccer League (NPSL), to begin play in the Mid-Atlantic Conference in 2014. In 2014, the team announced it was rebranding to Legacy 76 to reflect the year of its founding.

Year-by-year

Honors
 USL PDL Mid Atlantic Division Champions 2002

Head coaches
  Jeff Dominguez (2005–2006)
  Kevin Darcy (2007)
  Tim Cristian (2008–2009)
  Kevin Darcy (2015)

Stadiums
 Busch Field; Williamsburg, Virginia (2003–2005)
 Captains Field Christopher Newport University; Newport News, Virginia 2 games (2005)
 Albert-Daly Field; Williamsburg, Virginia (2006–2007)
 James City County Stadium; (Wanner Stadium) Williamsburg, Virginia (2008–present)
 Captains Field (Christopher Newport University), Newport News, Virginia (2014–2015)

Average attendance
Attendance stats are calculated by averaging each team's self-reported home attendances from the historical match archive at https://web.archive.org/web/20100105175057/http://www.uslsoccer.com/history/index_E.html.

 2001: 511
 2002: 419
 2003: 609
 2004: 462
 2005: 233
 2006: 248
 2007: 238
 2008: 197
 2009: 115
 2015: 823

References

External links
 Virginia Legacy

Association football clubs established in 1976
Defunct Premier Development League teams
Sports in Hampton Roads
Soccer clubs in Virginia
Soccer clubs in Hampton Roads
1976 establishments in Virginia
National Premier Soccer League teams